Corycus may refer to:
 Corycus (alga), a brown alga genus in the family Chordariaceae
 Hayton of Corycus, medieval Armenian historian
 places
 Corycus, a city of Cilicia Tracheia
 Corycus (Crete), a town of ancient Crete, Greece
 Corycus (Ionia), a town of ancient Ionia
 Corycus (Lycia), a city in Lycia
 Corycus (mountain), a mountain in Lydia
 Corycus (Pamphylia), a city in Pamphylia
 Gramvousa island off Crete, anciently known as Corycus
 Gramvousa Peninsula on Crete, anciently known as Corycus